Jennens and Bettridge (a partnership between Theodore Hyla Jennens, John Bettridge (snr), Aaron Jennens and John Bettridge (jnr) and later only A. Jennens and J. Bettridge (jnr))  (fl. 1815–1864) were highly regarded for producing quality papier-mâché wares. They acquired the workshops of Henry Clay, Japanner to George III and the Prince of Wales, in 1816. Their original premises were in Birmingham and they started a London branch at 3 West Halkin Street, Belgravia in 1837. Later offices were established in Paris and New York.

References

Manufacturing companies based in Birmingham, West Midlands
Papier-mâché